White Rock is an unincorporated community and census-designated place (CDP) in Los Alamos County, New Mexico. It is one of two major population centers in the county; the other is Los Alamos (the county seat). The population was 5,725 at the 2010 census. It is largely a bedroom community for employees of Los Alamos National Laboratory and their families. Access to White Rock from the town of Los Alamos and other cities and towns in New Mexico is via New Mexico State Road 4, which forms the northwestern boundary of the community. Administratively, White Rock is a neighborhood of Los Alamos; locals refer to Los Alamos (meaning not White Rock) as "the Townsite," or "the Hill".

History 
In 1947 the United States Atomic Energy Commission acquired land from the United States Forest Service to build a temporary community to house construction workers. That community was the first White Rock, which was abandoned by 1953. By 1958 all of the old White Rock buildings had been demolished or removed. The second and present White Rock was begun in 1962.

Geography
White Rock is located in southeastern Los Alamos County at  (35.819439, -106.204779). It is bordered to the north and east by Santa Fe; the eastern border follows the Rio Grande through White Rock Canyon. The CDP includes the neighborhood of Pajarito Acres, directly south of and at the same elevation as the White Rock townsite.

A gated entrance to Los Alamos National Laboratory is on Pajarito Road, accessed directly from White Rock.

White Rock Canyon

Largely undeveloped White Rock Canyon, on the eastern edge of the community, provides a wilderness recreation area heavily used by residents of White Rock and Santa Fe. The canyon was carved through basalt and tuff by the south-flowing Rio Grande. The canyon runs from the Otowi Suspension Bridge in the north and to Cochiti Dam in the south, with many smaller tributary canyons such Los Alamos, Mortandad, Water, Ancho, Frijoles, and Capulin Canyon. White Rock is situated on a portion of the west side of the canyon along with Bandelier National Monument, a section of Los Alamos National Laboratory, San Ildefonso Pueblo, Cochiti Pueblo, and Santa Fe National Forest. Across the river to the east rises the Caja del Rio.

For a few decades the Chili Line, a narrow gauge railroad, ran on the east bank of the river as far south as the mouth of Diablo Canyon;  some day the Rio Grande Trail may occupy the abandoned right of way.

Along the rim of the canyon are many basalt cliffs that are used by rock climbers.

White Rock Canyon Rim Trail 
 Distance:  one way
 Elevation: 6,300 to 
 Elevation Change: 
 Fitness Level: Easy
 Seasons: All seasons
 Trail Surface: Rocks and packed dirt
 Hazards: Cliffs, rattlesnakes

Blue Dot Trail 

The trailhead begins about 100 yards southwest of the overlook viewing platform, and is accessible from a small parking lot at the end of the last side road branching east off Overlook Road. Partway to the river a meadow lies on top of a large Toreva block bench (a large piece of terrain which has moved downhill as a unit).  At the midway point, the material underfoot changes from dark sharp basaltic rocks to light rounded granitic stones.  The trail passes a large spring seeping from scree as the trail nears the Rio Grande.  This water and water from the river are not safe to drink.
 Distance:  one way
 Elevation: 5,450 to 
 Elevation Change: 
 Fitness Level: Strenuous, but short
 Seasons: All seasons, except after heavy snow
 Trail Surface: Rocky and steep trail
 Hazards: Cliffs, loose footing, swift river

Red Dot Trail 

This trail, also known as Pajarito Springs Trail, is accessible from Piedra Loop in La Senda.  Numerous petroglyphs appear along the way, unseen by many hikers concentrating on their footing on this very steep and challenging trail.  The rock drawings are varied in style, from Kokopelli to abstract and geometric designs.  The local Tewa may have imported some designs from Native Americans of the Great Plains.  The Pajarito Springs are several in number and combine to form a small creek flowing into a pool via a small waterfall.  The trail continues to the Rio Grande.
 Distance:  one way
 Elevation: 5,500 to 
 Elevation Change: 
 Fitness Level: Strenuous, but short
 Seasons: All seasons, except after heavy snow
 Trail Surface: Very rocky trail
 Hazards: Cliffs, loose footing, swift river

River Trail 
 Distance:  one way
 Elevation: 5,400 to 
 Elevation Change: 
 Fitness Level: Easy
 Skill Level: Sections of the trail require route-finding ability
 Seasons: All seasons, except after heavy snow
 Trail Surface: Sand, river cobbles and rocks
 Hazards: Swift river

Demographics

As of the census of 2000, there were 6,045 people, 2,226 households, and 1,860 families residing in the CDP. The population density was 841.9 people per square mile (325.1/km). There were 2,282 housing units at an average density of 317.8 per square mile (122.7/km). The racial makeup of the CDP was 92.75% White, 0.25% African American, 0.53% Native American, 2.68% Asian, 0.02% Pacific Islander, 1.87% from other races, and 1.90% from two or more races. Hispanic or Latino of any race were 10.59% of the population.

There were 2,226 households, out of which 38.0% had children under the age of 18 living with them, 78.2% were married couples living together, 3.2% had a female householder with no husband present, and 16.4% were non-families. 13.8% of all households were made up of individuals, and 4.9% had someone living alone who was 65 years of age or older. The average household size was 2.71 and the average family size was 2.99.

In the CDP, the population was spread out, with 27.6% under the age of 18, 3.3% from 18 to 24, 24.1% from 25 to 44, 34.2% from 45 to 64, and 10.8% who were 65 years of age or older. The median age was 42 years. For every 100 females, there were 101.4 males. For every 100 females age 18 and over, there were 99.2 males.

The median income for a household in the CDP was $92,813, and the median income for a family was $96,716. Males had a median income of $77,216 versus $44,145 for females. The per capita income for the CDP was $36,288. About 1.1% of families and 1.3% of the population were below the poverty line, including 0.4% of those under age 18 and 3.0% of those age 65 or over.

White Rock Master Plan
The commercial center of White Rock has been in decline since approximately 1990, due in part to loss of retail revenues to the Internet and to "big box" stores in nearby communities. Los Alamos County recently began a major effort to revitalize the White Rock commercial center by improving infrastructure and seeking to attract new businesses. Part of the motivation for this effort is the transfer to Los Alamos County of Department of Energy lands just north of State Road 4. The revitalization effort has emphasized community input and is presently being driven by the White Rock Master Plan Implementation Committee, with the support of the County Council.

Community parks and tot lots

Overlook Park 
 playground
 1 youth baseball field (non-lighted)
 2 youth baseball fields (lighted)
 5 softball fields (non-lighted)
 1 softball field (lighted)
 4 soccer fields (non-lighted)
3 independent picnic areas
1 dog park
1 rc car track
1 area viewing platform (the overlook)

Piñon Park 
 playground
 2 full basketball courts
 3 tennis courts
 1 skateboard park
 Disc Golf Course

Rover Park 
 playground
 1 full basketball court
 2 tennis courts
 1 soccer field (non-lighted)

Jeffrey Tot Lot 
 playground

Mountain Meadows Tot Lot 
 playground

Education 
The whole county is a part of Los Alamos Public Schools.
Elementary schools in White Rock:
 Piñon Elementary School
 Chamisa Elementary School

The district's middle school and comprehensive high school are Los Alamos Middle School and Los Alamos High School, respectively.

References

External links

 Los Alamos County
 White Rock Master Plan
 White Rock Realtime Weather
 LANL TA-54 weather tower adjacent to intersection of Grand Canyon and State Road 4
 Rock Climbing Routes in White Rock Canyon

Census-designated places in Los Alamos County, New Mexico
Census-designated places in New Mexico